Margaret Whiting Sings the Jerome Kern Songbook is a 1960 studio album by Margaret Whiting, with an orchestra conducted and arranged by Russell Garcia, focusing on the songs of Jerome Kern. Originally released as a double-LP set by Verve Records in 1960, it was reissued on CD by Universal in Japan (1998, 2007) and the United States (2002).

Track listing 
 "Why Was I Born?" (Oscar Hammerstein II) – 3:22
 "Remind Me" (Dorothy Fields) – 2:55
 "The Song Is You" (Hammerstein) – 3:22
 "I Won't Dance" (Hammerstein, Otto Harbach, Fields, Jimmy McHugh) – 2:25
 "Don't Ever Leave Me" (Hammerstein) – 3:19
 "I'm Old Fashioned" (Johnny Mercer) – 2:44
 "All in Fun" (Hammerstein) – 3:06
 "Why Do I Love You?" (Hammerstein) – 2:34
 "Can't Help Lovin' Dat Man" (Hammerstein) – 3:57
 "A Fine Romance" (Fields) – 3:39
 "Look for the Silver Lining" (Buddy DeSylva) – 2:56
 "All the Things You Are" (Hammerstein) – 3:49
 "Poor Pierrot" (Harbach) – 3:23
 "Smoke Gets in Your Eyes" (Harbach) – 3:57
 "Let's Begin" (Harbach) – 2:15
 "D'Ye Love Me?" (Hammerstein, Harbach) – 3:24
 "Dearly Beloved" (Mercer) – 2:52
 "Long Ago (and Far Away) " (Ira Gershwin) – 4:17
 "The Way You Look Tonight" (Fields) – 3:33
 "You Couldn't Be Cuter" (Fields) – 2:05
 "Yesterdays" (Harbach) – 3:08
 "Bill" (Hammerstein, Kern, P.G. Wodehouse) – 4:03
 "She Didn't Say Yes" (Harbach) – 2:25
 "The Touch of Your Hand" (Harbach) – 3:42

All music written by Jerome Kern with lyricists as indicated.

Personnel 
 Margaret Whiting - vocals
 Russell Garcia - arranger, conductor

References 

1960 albums
Margaret Whiting albums
Verve Records albums
Albums arranged by Russell Garcia (composer)
Albums produced by Norman Granz
Albums conducted by Russell Garcia (composer)